Aeronectris is a genus of moths in the family Agonoxenidae, with a single species A. euacta found in India.

Species
Aeronectris euacta Meyrick, 1917

References
Natural History Museum Lepidoptera genus database

Agonoxeninae
Monotypic moth genera
Moths of Asia